The 2016–17 season was AS Monaco FC's fourth consecutive season in Ligue 1 since promotion from Ligue 2 in 2013. They participated in Ligue 1, the Coupe de France, the Coupe de la Ligue and the UEFA Champions League.

Following aggregate victories over Fenerbahçe and Villarreal, Monaco qualified for the group stage of the Champions League, and sealed their place in the last 16 as group winners following a 2–1 win over Tottenham Hotspur on the fifth matchday. Monaco defeated Manchester City on away goals in the round of 16 and recorded a 6–3 aggregate win over Borussia Dortmund in the quarter-finals, reaching the semi-finals of the Champions League for the first time since 2004; they failed to reach the final after a 4–1 aggregate defeat to Juventus.

Monaco also won Ligue 1 for the first time since 2000, preventing Paris Saint-Germain from earning a fifth consecutive title. They went on a twelve-match winning run to close out the season and finished their league campaign with 95 points and 107 goals scored. The club additionally reached the final of the Coupe de la Ligue and the semi-finals of the Coupe de France; they were eliminated by PSG in both competitions.

Squad

Reserves

Out on loan

Transfers

Summer

In:

Out:

Winter

In:

Out:

Friendlies

Competitions

Ligue 1

League table

Results summary

Results by round

Matches

Coupe de France

Coupe de la Ligue

UEFA Champions League

Third qualifying round

Play-off round

Group stage

Knockout phase

Round of 16

Quarter-finals

Semi-finals

Statistics

Appearances and goals

|-
!colspan="14"|Players loaned out during the season

|-
!colspan="14"|Players who left the club during the season

|}

Goalscorers

Disciplinary record

Notes

References

External links

AS Monaco FC seasons
Monaco
French football championship-winning seasons
Monaco
AS Monaco
AS Monaco